The 1996 Florida Strikers season was the first season of the new team in the United Systems of Independent Soccer Leagues, playing in the USISL Premier League.  It was also the thirtieth season of the club in professional soccer.  Previously the club had been named Fort Lauderdale Strikers and fielded a team in the USISL Professional League.  This year, the team finished in third place in the Southern Division, and did not make the playoffs.

Background

Review

Competitions

USISL Premier League regular season

Blue denotes team has won their division.
Green denotes team has won playoff spot.
Orange denotes team gets bye into semifinals as defending champion.

Central Conference

Northern Division 

* Detroit, Kalamazoo, Lexington, and Michigan were all penalized 3 points.
** Grand Rapids did not have a home stadium this year, and played only road games.

Southern Division 

* Sioux City was penalized 6 points.
The game between Sioux City and Wichita was postponed and could not be rescheduled before end of the season.  The game was cancelled because it had no effect on the playoffs.

Eastern Conference

Northern Division 

* Nashville was penalized 6 points. Jackson was penalized 3 points.

Southern Division 

* Cocoa, Florida, and Orlando were all penalized 3 points.

Western Conference

Northern Division 

* Colorado Springs and Spokane were both penalized 3 points.

Southern Division 

* Central Coast and San Diego were both penalized 3 points

Results summaries

Results by round

Match reports

USISL Premier League Playoffs

Bracket

Match reports

Statistics

Transfers

References 

1996
Fort Lauderdale Strikers
Florida Strikers